Petropavlivka is an urban-type settlement in Synelnykove Raion, Dnipropetrovsk Oblast in Ukraine. It hosts the administration of Petropavlivka settlement hromada, one of the hromadas of Ukraine. Population: 

Petropavlivka is located on the left bank of the Samara River, a left tributary of the Dnieper.

Until 18 July 2020, Petropavlivka was the administrative center of Petropavlivka Raion. The raion was abolished in July 2020 as part of the administrative reform of Ukraine, which reduced the number of raions of Dnipropetrovsk Oblast to seven. The area of Petropavlivka Raion was merged into Synelnykove Raion.

Economy

Transportation
Petropavlivka is just north of the Highway M04, connecting Pokrovsk with Dnipro and Kryvyi Rih. A road to Kramatorsk branches off north.

Petropavlivka railway station is located southeast of the settlement, in the village of Zaliznychne, on the railway connecting Pokrovsk and Pavlohrad.

Notable people
 Elena Rozmirovich (1886–1953)

References

Urban-type settlements in Synelnykove Raion